Dowden Tannery is a historic tannery building located at Cold Spring Harbor in Suffolk County, New York.  It was built about 1840 and is a three bay, two story brick structure coated in stucco.  Two, one story gable roofed side additions were built in the early 20th century. The tannery is located in a residential area southeast of Woodbury Road, and east of Cold Spring Harbor Railroad Station. Long Island Rail Road's Port Jefferson Branch runs behind the building, which is accessible only from a diagonal driveway leading from above the embankment of West Rogues Path.

It was added to the National Register of Historic Places in 1985.

References

Industrial buildings and structures on the National Register of Historic Places in New York (state)
Industrial buildings completed in 1840
Buildings and structures in Suffolk County, New York
Tanneries
National Register of Historic Places in Suffolk County, New York
1840 establishments in New York (state)